Jean Cohen (1941 – 2004 in Paris) was a French scientist, known for his studies on rotaviruses.

Publications

References

French virologists
1941 births
2004 deaths